The 1938 Duquesne Dukes football team was an American football team that represented Duquesne University as an independent during the 1938 college football season. In its third and final season under head coach John "Clipper" Smith, Duquesne compiled a 4–6 record and was outscored by a total of 114 to 96. The team played its home games at Forbes Field in Pittsburgh.

Schedule

References

Duquesne
Duquesne Dukes football seasons
Duquesne Dukes football